The 2016–17 UConn Huskies men's basketball team represented the University of Connecticut in the 2016–17 NCAA Division I men's basketball season. The Huskies were led by fifth-year head coach Kevin Ollie. The Huskies split their home games between the XL Center in Hartford, Connecticut, and the Harry A. Gampel Pavilion on the UConn campus in Storrs, Connecticut. The Huskies were members of the American Athletic Conference. They finished the season 16–17, 9–9 in AAC play to finish in a tie for fifth place. They defeated South Florida and Houston to advance to the semifinals of the AAC tournament where they lost to Cincinnati.

Previous season 
The Huskies finished the 2015–16 season 25–11, 11–7 in AAC play to finish in sixth place. The Huskies won the AAC tournament as the fifth seed, defeating Cincinnati and Temple to reach the championship game. They defeated Memphis in the championship. The Huskies received a No. 9 seed in the NCAA tournament and defeated No. 8 seed Colorado in the First Round before losing to No. 1 seed Kansas in the Second Round.

Departures

Recruits

Roster

Schedule and results

|-
!colspan=12 style=""| Exhibition
|-

|-
!colspan=12 style=""| Regular season
|-

|-
!colspan=12 style=""|American Athletic Conference tournament

Rankings

References

UConn Huskies men's basketball seasons
Connecticut
2016 in sports in Connecticut
2017 in sports in Connecticut